Fandriana District is a district in central Madagascar. It is part of Amoron'i Mania Region. Its capital is Fandriana.

Communes
The district is further divided into 13 communes:

 Alakamisy Ambohimahazo
 Ankarinoro
 Betsimisotra
 Fandriana
 Fiadanana
 Imito
 Mahazoarivo
 Miarinavaratra
 Milamaina
 Sahamadio
 Sandrandahy
 Tatamalaza
 Tsarazaza

References

Districts of Amoron'i Mania